The National cavalry was a branch of Polish–Lithuanian cavalry in the Polish-Lithuanian armed forces in the last quarter of the 18th century. Formed as a merger of previously-existing units of Winged hussars, pancerni and petyhorcy that were still in service after the Confederation of Bar. In 1777 the Sejm new regulations converted all units of heavy cavalry and medium cavalry and reformed them into a line cavalry, roughly similar to later uhlans popular in Europe in the 19th century. Existing dragoon and Front or Vanguard Regiments were outside this reform The National Cavalry had a very short history of 20 years, and some units stationed in the eastern Polish–Lithuanian Commonwealth were forcibly incorporated into the Russian cavalry following the Second Partition of Poland, and the remainder was disbanded together with the rest of Polish–Lithuanian armed forces after the final partition in 1795. The Sejm's 1777 decision was a rather late effort to modernize Polish–Lithuanian cavalry, along with the much earlier trend of evolution of European cavalry towards the more modern organization of the cavalry regiments into more mobile formations. The most modern part of the reform was the establishment of some very modern battle dress uniforms for these cavalrymen, and in turn, this uniform of the National Cavalry inspired numerous similar uniforms and employment of 'Polish lance' in the rest of  Europe, notably the Austrian, Prussian, Russian cavalry, and later of the  French cavalry of the Napoleonic Wars.

History 
Initial reorganization divided the National Cavalry of the Polish–Lithuanian Commonwealth into four brigades (each numbering roughly 737 officers and soldiers and horses), two in the Crown of the Polish Kingdom and two in the Grand Duchy of Lithuania. The brigades were further composed of 24 banners altogether. The ancient and ineffective companion–retainer system was preserved and the number of companions and retainers was to be equal, companions armed with a painted "kopia" or "kopija" (lance), sabre and pistols, and retainers armed with a cavalry carbine and sabre. In 1784 Sejm increased the number of men in each brigade to 876, divided into 6 squadrons, they in turn divided into 4 banners, each squadron 144 men and horses, while banner roughly 35 men and horses. On 12 November 1788 the Sejm increased the number of cavalrymen in each brigade and since then the brigades were to be 3600 men strong. The division onto banners was also abolished and replaced with a division into squadrons. Each brigade was since then composed of 24 squadrons.  Following this reform, each squadron of National Cavalry was composed of four cug sub-units. The first cug in every squadron consisted of 32 former "towarzysz" Hussars, while the remaining four were composed of 32 former Pancerni cavalrymen. This allowed the unit to be fairly flexible, with the first cug used for break-through charges and the remaining three in supporting roles.

During the Kościuszko Uprising of 1794 additional units of National Cavalry were raised in various parts of Poland. Altogether, the government formed 12 brigades of national cavalry, 2 regiments of horse guard and 16 regiments of Front Guard. However, only a few of them ever reached the specified number of men-at-arms. The National Cavalry took part in several battles of the Russo-Polish war of 1792 and the Kościuszko Uprising. Among the most notable were:
 Battle of Zieleńce of June 18, 1792
 Battle of Dubienka of July 18, 1792
 Battle of Racławice of April 4, 1794
 Battle of Szczekociny of June 6, 1794
 Battle of Krupczyce of September 17, 1794
 Battle of Terespol of September 19, 1794
 Battle of Maciejowice of October 10, 1794

Following the partitions of Poland the National Cavalry was disbanded.

Uniforms, horse tack and arms 

The soldiers of the National Cavalry were dressed in the modernized and synchronized Polish national battle dress reflecting the appearance of Hussar and Pancerni dress prescribed by the 1746 proclamation of hetman Michał Kazimierz Radziwiłł. The 1746 Hussar regiments were dressed in crimson caps and kontuszes, with Navy-blue lapels and collars, while the Pancerni wore Navy-blue caps and kontuszes, with crimson lapels and collars. The only difference between the units formed in the Grand Duchy and those from the Crown were the buttons: silver for Polish and golden for Lithuanian units.

In 1785 the uniforms were modified and all units of national cavalry since then used Navy-blue Polish kurtka with red (later various colors) coloured pannel (pipping) of the Pancerni, red Polish-style loose fit pants (szarawary) with a double-lampas, buttoned with six buttons on the outside below the knee,  and crimson Polish (square-top) czapka of the Hussars for the companions and red or black Kolpak for the retainers, changed later into a black "giwer" hat, eight inches tall. On 11 March 1791, the new regulation was passed. Essentially the uniforms remained unchanged, but the number of adornments was lessened in order to make the uniforms less expensive. However, the new uniforms were never fully introduced. For rain and cold weather, they had cavalry coats of white color buttoned with 12 buttons in the front, and heavier cloth pants, while during the summer the retainers wore loose linen summer pants. They wore black boots were of Polish design, with a one-inch heel and spurs attached.

The main offensive weapons for the National Cavalry regiments were: 'kopija' (lances)(companion) with swallow-tail pennon below the point, and cavalry carbines (retainers) and various Polish sabres for all. Horses were of Polish breeding (mostly from the country's Podolian and Volhynian studs) of medium stature, crested and with a high neck, strong footed with 'iron hooves,' fast and with much stamina. Trumpeters traditionally rode paint horses for show and contrast. Horse harness was very well defined in the 1791 regulations: bridle with snaffle bit and curb-bit and double reins, breastplate with small 'rose' in the center,  horse saddled with a Polish wooden-treed, leather-covered saddle (similar to the Hungarian hussar one) with high pommel and cantle, and croupier attached, with two leather pistol holsters attached to the saddle. Saddle was covered with a dyed textile 'mitug' (short shabraque) for a companion and black-dyed sheepskin 'mitug' with cloth double-color edge for a retainer, a 32-inch cloth valise behind the saddle under the mitug, with a grain bag underneath this valise. In addition two linen bags attached to the saddle and a small ax for a retainer.

References 

  Bronisław Gembarzewski: "Rodowody pułków polskich i oddziałów równorzędnych", Biblioteka Muzeum Wojska, Warszawa 1925
  Szymon Kobyliński: "Gawędy o broni i mundurze", Warszawa 1984
  Brygada I Kawalerii Narodowej "Rekonstrukcja munduru towarzysza Kawalerii Narodowej Koronnej z lat 1791–1794" Piotr M. Zalewski, Militaria i fakty.
  Forum Barwa i broń na gery.pl

Military units and formations established in 1775
1795 disestablishments
Polish cavalry
Military history of the Polish–Lithuanian Commonwealth